Ivanílton Sérgio Guedes, usually known as Sérgio Guedes (born 7 November 1962), is a Brazilian football coach and former goalkeeper. He is the current head coach of Portuguesa Santista.

Career
Born in Rio Claro, Sérgio Guedes began his football career playing for Araçatuba. Between 1984 and 1989 he played for Ponte Preta, Santos, Goiás and Cruzeiro, winning the Copa do Brasil. In subsequent years he played for many clubs, among others, Botafogo-SP, Lousano Paulista, Santos Coritiba. He ended his playing career with Portuguesa Santista, in 2002.

At the end of their football Sérgio Guedes was a coach. From 2006 he was São Carlos, Ponte Preta, Santo André, Bahia, São Caetano and Portuguesa. In 2014, with the Oeste, where commanded during 6 departures. and in April of that year was for the Santa Cruz, where he left in September of the same year. In June 2015, hit with the Mogi Mirim in order to save lot of sticking in the Série B.

Honours

Player
 Cruzeiro
 Copa do Brasil: 1993

 Internacional
 Campeonato Gaúcho: 1994

References

1964 births
Living people
People from Rio Claro, São Paulo
Brazilian footballers
Campeonato Brasileiro Série A players
Brazilian football managers
Campeonato Brasileiro Série B managers
Campeonato Brasileiro Série A managers
Associação Esportiva Araçatuba players
Associação Atlética Ponte Preta players
Santos FC players
Goiás Esporte Clube players
Cruzeiro Esporte Clube players
Sport Club Internacional players
Botafogo Futebol Clube (SP) players
Paulista Futebol Clube players
Esporte Clube São José players
Coritiba Foot Ball Club players
América Futebol Clube (SP) players
Grêmio Esportivo Sãocarlense players
Associação Atlética Portuguesa (Santos) players
Associação Atlética Portuguesa (Santos) managers
São Carlos Futebol Clube managers
Associação Atlética Ponte Preta managers
Esporte Clube Santo André managers
Esporte Clube Bahia managers
Associação Desportiva São Caetano managers
Associação Portuguesa de Desportos managers
Guaratinguetá Futebol managers
Red Bull Brasil managers
Sport Club do Recife managers
Esporte Clube XV de Novembro (Piracicaba) managers
Ceará Sporting Club managers
Oeste Futebol Clube managers
Santa Cruz Futebol Clube managers
Mogi Mirim Esporte Clube managers
Rio Claro Futebol Clube managers
Esporte Clube Água Santa managers
Association football goalkeepers
Footballers from São Paulo (state)